The Witch is the second album by Ambar, and collaboration between actress and singer María Conchita Alonso and Italo–Venezuelan producer Rudy La Scala. It was released in 1980 and was their second and final collaboration. Like its predecessor, the album Love Maniac, it was recorded in English. However, trends were already starting to change and the popularity of disco from the 1970s was ending, so this album is less dance-oriented and it leans more towards rock. Alonso reinvented her image for this release, dressing as a gypsy for promotional appearances. That imagery, together with the album title and her reputation for wildness in the media fueled rumors about her being a Satan worshipper in the tabloids.

The title track was used as the promotional single for the album but didn't match the success of the album. However, it was a moderate hit in Venezuela and paved the way for Maria Conchita's solo debut "Dangerous Rhythm". La Scala went on to become a solo artist in the mid 1980s.

Besides the title track, the album includes five other songs where Alonso sings the lead vocals ("Lonely Is The World", "Mr. Renny", "I'm OK", "Do You Love?" and "Look Up") and a duet with Rudy La Scala ("Forever Darling"). La Scala sings the lead vocal on "Tati's Song". The album also includes an instrumental song, "End Of A Dream".

The album has only been released on 12" vinyl and cassette, and is currently out of print.

Track listing
"The Witch"
"Lonely Is The World"
"Mr. Renny"
"Tati's Song"
"I'm O.K."
"Do You Love?"
"Look Up"
"Forever Darling"
"End Of A Dream"

1980 albums